It's a Funky Thing to Do is the eleventh album by the saxophonist Hank Crawford, released on the Cotillion label in 1971.

Reception

AllMusic stated: "Crawford plays well, as usual but, other than 'Parker's Mood', none of the seven selections are particularly memorable nor do they stand out from the crowd".

Track listing
All compositions by Hank Crawford except as indicated
 "It's a Funky Thing to Do" (Pee Wee Ellis) - 3:34 	
 "If Ever I Should Leave You" (Alan Jay Lerner, Frederick Loewe) - 4:34
 "Hills of Love" (Carlos Malcolm, James Shaw) - 5:19
 "Sophisticated Soul" - 4:39
 "You're the One" (Adolph Smith) - 4:21
 "Parker's Mood" (Charlie Parker) - 6:25
 "Kingsize Man" - 5:57

Personnel 
Hank Crawford - alto saxophone
Richard Tee - piano (tracks 2-8)
Pee Wee Ellis - electric piano (track 1)
Eric Gale, Cornell Dupree - guitar
Chuck Rainey - electric bass
Ron Carter - bass
Bernard Purdie - drums

References 

1971 albums
Hank Crawford albums
Cotillion Records albums
Albums produced by Joel Dorn